Benjamin Yudin ( born in 1944) is an American rabbi and important figure in the New Jersey Jewish community.

Biography 
Rabbi Yudin lives in Fair Lawn, New Jersey, where he is the rabbi of Congregation Shomrei Torah. He is an instructor of Talmud, Bible, and Jewish Law at the Mechina program of the James Striar School of Yeshiva University's Undergraduate Jewish Studies program, where he formerly served as dean.

Rabbi Yudin received ordination from the Rabbi Isaac Elchanan Theological Seminary of Yeshiva University, where he was also awarded a master's degree in Jewish History.

Activities 
Rabbi Yudin and his wife Shevi are well known in Bergen County and beyond for their extensive communal and charitable work. He is a senior member of the Rabbinical Council of Bergen County (RCBC). As one of the first rabbis to serve in Bergen County, he was instrumental in developing the Orthodox Jewish communal infrastructure there, including a synagogue, mikveh, and Yeshivat Noam in Paramus, New Jersey. In 2007, he was appointed by Governor Jon Corzine to the New Jersey-Israel Commission.

Rabbi Yudin gives a weekly radio address (drasha) regarding ethical messages from the weekly Parsha (Torah portion) to an audience of over 50,000 in the New York Metropolitan Area on the radio program JM in the AM on WFMU. His publications include a book "Rabbi Benjamin Yudin on the Parsha" by Mosaica Press, an introduction and explanatory essays to the Artscroll Transliterated Linear Siddur and regularly published online essays.

See also
 List of Orthodox Rabbis

References

 
https://web.archive.org/web/20070105094009/http://shomrei-torah.org/ravyudin.htm
https://web.archive.org/web/20070413042659/http://www.nachumsegal.com/archive.cfm?view=2&personality=25844
http://www.vosizneias.com/91566/2011/09/18/fair-lawn-nj-mishpacha-profiles-rabbi-benjamin-yudin/

External links
 a collection of Rabbi Yudin's print articles and audio & video lectures on TorahWeb.org
https://web.archive.org/web/20070104192457/http://shomrei-torah.org/pachimktanim.htm - archives of Rabbi Yudin's "Pachim Ketanim" column of brief halacha
https://web.archive.org/web/20070413042659/http://www.nachumsegal.com/archive.cfm?view=2&personality=25844 - archived radio drashot
 http://mosaicapress.org/?p=519 - Rabbi Benjamin Yudin on the Parsha, book

People from Fair Lawn, New Jersey
American Modern Orthodox rabbis
Living people
Yeshiva University alumni
Yeshiva University faculty
Rabbi Isaac Elchanan Theological Seminary semikhah recipients
1944 births
21st-century American Jews